This is a list of Rijksmonuments in Groningen.

Appingedam

|}

Garreweer

|}

Jukwerd

|}

Laskwerd

|}

Marsum

|}

Opwierde

|}

Solwerd

|}

 
Groningen